ONroute LP is a Canadian service company which has the 50-year concession to operate highway rest areas along Highway 400 and Highway 401 in the province of Ontario until 2060. The company was founded as Host Kilmer Service Centres, a joint venture between international hospitality company HMSHost (a subsidiary of Autogrill) and Kilmer van Nostrand (an investment company owned by Canadian businessman Larry Tanenbaum). ONroute was acquired by Arjun Infrastructure Partners and Fengate Asset Management in May 2019.

The "ONroute" brand name is a modified version of the French phrase "en route", using the province's postal abbreviation of "ON".

History
Construction of Ontario Highways 400 and 401 began in the early 1950s, with the last section of 401 completed in 1968. Both roads were intended as bypasses, going around populated areas instead of through them (the highways 11/27 and 2 which they replaced were Main Street in nearly every served community) and therefore initially had few services. A series of rest stops was constructed as part of the highway in the 1960s in rural areas to provide a full-service restaurant (later replaced with franchised fast food) and a service station (eventually curtailed to fuel only, no repair services). All but a few of these dated from the same era with strong similarity in design.

The rest areas on Highway 401 at Ingersoll and Newcastle (both serving only the westbound carriageway) and the Highway 400 rest area in Maple (Vaughan) (serving southbound traffic only) were rebuilt in the late 1990s, ahead of the other remaining rest areas being tendered to HKSC for redevelopment, and as their design is sufficiently modern they remain in operation. Unlike all other rest areas, Esso remains as the gasoline distributor at these locations.

From the late 1980s to 2010, rest areas on the two highways were operated by Scott's Hospitality, a major publicly traded Canadian restaurant operator.  In 1999 Scott's was acquired by John Bitove's Obelysk Inc and the highway centers were sold to HMS Host Marriott in 2005.  Shortly thereafter the government of Ontario tendered all 17 highway centres to rebuild and operate on a new long term contract.  In 2010 HKSC was selected as the new operator for all of its rest areas Since 2010–11, HKSC has demolished the 1960s-era rest stops, leaving most rest stops out of operation for a year or more, and used the sites to construct new ONroute service stations. Most of the remaining redevelopment projects were completed in 2013. Partners in the redevelopment projects included EllisDon Construction, Quadrangle, and Bruce Mau Design. All of the redeveloped locations were designed to meet the LEED certification standards of the Canadian Green Building Council, as well as current standards of accessibility for travellers with disabilities.

On June 13, 2019, HMS Host announced the sale of all 23 ONroute centres to Arjun Infrastructure and Fengate Asset Management. Arjun is a British company which is the minority shareholder in the similar Welcome Break chain of motorway service areas in the United Kingdom, while Fengate is a Canadian asset management firm.

In 2020, seating areas were temporarily closed to prevent the spread of COVID-19. They were reopened during Stage 3 of the Ontario government's reopening plan.

In December 2021, Caroline Mulroney and Todd Smith announced that 17 of the 23 stations would have charging stations for electric vehicles installed by mid 2022, and three more by the end of 2022. They will be installed by Ivy, a joint venture between Hydro One and Ontario Power Generation at a cost of $11.5 million.

Services

Each ONroute location features a Canadian Tire gas station, a Canadian Imperial Bank of Commerce ATM, and a 24-hour convenience store called M Market. While each location offers a different selection of fast food providers, all locations feature a Tim Hortons together with some combination of A&W, Big Smoke Burger, Brioche Dorée, Burger King, Cinnabon, East Side Mario's Pronto, Extreme Pita, KFC, Taco Bell, Mr. Sub, New York Fries, Pizza Pizza, PurBlendz, Starbucks, Swiss Chalet,  Wendy's or Yogen Früz outlets. In some cases, selection at the food outlets is more limited or prices higher than in non-highway locations of the same-brand chains. Many of the smaller brands no longer operate on the ONroute network.

As of July 2020, the brands that remain include:

 Tim Hortons
 A&W
 Burger King
 Circle K
 Esso
 Extreme Pita
 Gas+
 M Market
 New York Fries
 Starbucks
 Subway
 Wendy's

All ONroute locations have free Wi-Fi. In addition, the westernmost (Tilbury) and easternmost (Bainsville) locations along Highway 401 also feature Ontario Tourist Information Centres, as they serve as gateway locations for tourists entering the province from Michigan or Quebec.

Locations
There are 19 ONroute locations sited along Highway 401 and four rest areas located on the southern section of Highway 400 between Toronto and Barrie (southbound at Innisfil and Vaughan and northbound at King City and Barrie).

References

External links

ONroute

Service companies of Canada
2010 establishments in Ontario
Companies based in Ontario
Rest areas in Canada
Transport in Ontario
Public–private partnership projects in Canada